The tree sponge (Echinoclathria dichotoma) is a species of demosponge. It is known from the west coast of South Africa to Cape Agulhas. It is endemic to this region.

Description 
It is a bright red to dirty orange sponge which grows upright and branches like a tree. The surface texture is smooth and the branch tips are rounded. Its oscula are small (< and inconspicuous. The surface may be covered in a slimy mucus.

Distribution and habitat 

Ecology
This sponge is often colonised by a white zoanthid, Parazoanthus sp.

References

Poecilosclerida
Sponges described in 1963